The Lincoln Capri is an automobile that was sold by the Lincoln division of Ford Motor Company from 1952 until 1959.  A full-size luxury car, the Lincoln Capri derives its name from an Italian island in the Gulf of Naples.  Introduced as a premium trim variant of the two-door Lincoln Cosmopolitan, the Capri was introduced in 1952 as a stand-alone model line serving as the premium Lincoln.  With the introduction of the Lincoln Premiere (and Continental), the Capri replaced the Cosmopolitan as the standard Lincoln product line.

The Lincoln Capri was produced across three generations; following its withdrawal, Lincoln rebranded the Capri using only its division name (following a practice used from 1946 to 1951).  Along with the Lincoln Premiere and the Continental model lines, the Lincoln Capri was replaced by the 1961 Lincoln Continental.

First generation (1952–1955)

Competing against the Cadillac Series 62, Chrysler New Yorker, and Packard Patrician, 14,342 Capris were sold in its debut year, and nearly double that, 26,640, in 1953. It readily outsold its stablemate, the Cosmopolitan, each year until the Cosmopolitan's demise. The Capri had a new Lincoln 90 degree V8 engine. It was not offered in an extended length limousine, and the listed retail price was US$3,665 for the convertible ($ in  dollars ) which was a significant price reduction of luxury sedans the company had produced in the past and very close in price to competitor vehicles of the same time. The exclusive Lincoln Continental had been discontinued in 1948 making the Capri the flagship product while design and research had started on the eventual return of the Continental name with the 1956 Continental Mark II.

In the October, 1952 issue of Popular Mechanics, a Lincoln Capri with the new   overhead valve Lincoln Y-block was tested. 0-60 mph time was 14.8 seconds, while the quarter-mile was 21.3 seconds.

In 1955, the Capri featured a new   Lincoln Y-Block V8 (with greater displacement and, at 8.5:1, higher compression than before), featuring a four-barrel carburetor, mated to a standard (Ford-built) 3-speed Turbo-Drive automatic transmission.

Riding on a  wheelbase and measuring  overall, the 1955 Capri was offered as a two-door hardtop coupé ( shipping weight), two-door convertible ( shipping weight), or a four-door sedan ( shipping weight).

The Capri was also one of the first vehicles to offer an automatic headlight dimmer as optional equipment. It sold 23,673 copies, amounting to 87% of Lincoln's total output that year, actually down from 29,552 in 1954.

Second generation (1956–1957)

For 1956, the Capri shared a division-wide restyling and gained the new 285 hp (213 kW)  Lincoln Y-Block V8 (with a four-barrel carburetor and 9:1 compression), as well as all-new 12-volt electrical system to cope with the proliferation of power accessories. The Capri moved down-market, becoming Lincoln's entry-level model and the newly introduced Premiere based on it became the upper level Lincoln-branded model. In addition, the convertible disappeared from the model range, which already lacked for a four-door hardtop. Sales dropped dramatically, to only 8,791 in 1956 while the listed retail price for the Hardtop Sport Coupe was US$4,119 ($ in  dollars ).
This is not to imply that over all sales did not increase for 1956.  The total production for both Capri and Premiere models was 50,322. Four-way power seats were optional. 

The Capri's appearance borrowed from the radically different concept cars, the Mercury XM-800 and the Lincoln Futura in an era of fascination with the Space Race and Mid-century modern architecture and appearances. 1957 introduced a driving light below the conventional sealed beam, two-way headlight while giving an appearance of having stacked dual headlights.

A new camshaft and higher 10:1 compression boosted output to 300 hp (224 kW),. The new cam did not, however, increase compression, contrary to Flory's misapprehension. Even so, sales declined again, to 5,900 units (despite the addition of a 4-door landau hardtop).  A facelifted design for 1957 featured more pronounced fins.
Total production for 1957 for the Capri and Premiere lines was 41,123.

To emphasize Lincoln's exclusivity and specialized appearance, there were 20 available colors, with 34 two-tone exterior color selections for 1956, increasing to 76 two-tone color choices and only 18 single color selections for 1957.

Third generation (1958–1959)

These were the first Lincolns produced at the new Wixom, Michigan, plant, and were made on a unibody platform much like the Lincoln-Zephyr and the original Lincoln Continental. While advertising brochures made the case that Continental Division was still a separate make, the car shared its body with that year's Lincoln. The Lincoln Capri was the base model in the Lincoln product line, with the Lincoln Premiere positioned as higher level of standard equipment. Lincoln lost over $60 million during 1958-1960, partly reflecting the expense of developing perhaps the largest unibody car ever made. The 1958 full-size Lincoln sold poorly in all models because of the economic recession in the U.S.

The 1958–1959 Lincoln Capri was one of the largest cars ever made, larger than contemporaneous Cadillacs and Imperials, and with their canted headlights and scalloped fenders had styling considered by many to be excessive even in that decade of styling excess.
  The all-new 375 hp (280 kW)  MEL V8 was a welcome addition. The  front and  rear shoulder room they possessed set a record for Lincoln that still stands to this day. Sales were up, to 6,859, the landau sedan making up almost half, at 3,014 copies. Heater and defroster (at US$110), AM radio (US$144), and seat belts (US$25) were all optional. One rare option was an FM radio for $129(had to have the AM also). Brakes were 11-inch drums.

The reputation for "excessive styling" is perhaps ironic given the enormous amount of styling talent that was connected with the development and modification of Lincolns of this vintage. George W. Walker, known for his contribution to the development of the original Ford Thunderbird, was Vice-President in charge of Styling at Ford during this time. Elwood Engel, famous for being lead designer of the 1961 Lincoln Continental and for his work as chief designer at Chrysler in the 1960s, was Staff Stylist (and consequently roamed all of the design studios) at Ford during this period and worked very closely with John Najjar in developing not only the 1958, but also the 1959 update. After John Najjar was relieved of his responsibilities as Chief Stylist of Lincoln in 1957 he became Engel's executive assistant, and the two worked closely together in the "stilleto studio" in developing the 1961 Lincoln Continental, which of course won an award for its superlative styling. After Engel left Ford in 1961, Najjar became the lead designer of the Ford Mustang I concept car, which later gave birth to the Ford Mustang. Don Delarossa, who succeeded Najjar as Chief Stylist of Lincoln, was responsible for the 1960 Continental and Premiere update, and went on to become chief designer at Chrysler in the 1980s. Alex Tremulis, who was Chief Stylist at Auburn-Cord-Duesenberg in the mid to late 1930s and famous for his work on the 1948 Tucker Sedan, was head of Ford's Advanced Styling Studio during this period, and it was his Ford La Tosca concept car, with its oval overlaid with an "X" theme, that gave birth to the "slant eyed monster" nickname to the 1958 Lincoln front end.

Despite an increase in sales in 1959, to 7,929 units, the Capri was not renewed for 1960.

1960 Lincoln 
For the 1960 model year, Lincoln introduced a namesake model line to serve as a replacement for the discontinued Lincoln Capri.  Intended as a competitor for the Cadillac Series 62 and Chrysler New Yorker, the 1960 Lincoln combined the trim of the Lincoln Capri with the facelift adopted by the 1960 Lincoln Premiere and Continental Mark V.

As with the Premiere and Continental, the Lincoln was fitted with a 430 cubic-inch V8; a switch to a 2-barrel carburetor for all three vehicles reduced engine output to 310 hp.

For 1961, Lincoln consolidated its model lines from three to one, with a Lincoln Continental serving as the replacement for the Lincoln, Premiere and Continental Mark V.

Use in motorsport 
The Lincoln Capri competed in the Stock Car category of the Pan American Road Race from 1952 to 1954.  In 1952 and 1953, the Capri earned first through fourth place, with the model taking first and second place in 1954 (the final year of the race).

Further use of nameplate 
Following its use by the Lincoln division, the Capri nameplate would see subsequent use by both Ford and Mercury for the next three decades.  Ford UK produced the Ford Consul Capri from 1962 to 1964 as a coupe version of its mid-size model range.  Ford of Europe produced the Ford Capri compact sports coupe from 1968 to 1986, largely designed as the European equivalent of the Ford Mustang.

As a Mercury, the Capri nameplate first saw use as a trim level for the Mercury Comet from 1966 to 1967.  From 1970 to 1978, the Ford Capri was sold by Lincoln-Mercury in North America (without a divisional nameplate).  As a replacement, from 1979 to 1986, the Mercury Capri was sold as the Mercury counterpart of the Ford Mustang.   From 1991 to 1994, the Mercury Capri was sold as a 2+2 roadster, imported from Ford of Australia, which produced its version as the Ford Capri.

Alongside Zephyr, Capri is the only nameplate ever used by all three Ford divisions.

Notes

References

 Flammang, James, Standard Catalog of American Cars 1976-1999. Krause publications, 1999.
 Flory,  J. "Kelly", Jr. American Cars 1946-1959. Jefferson, NC:  McFarland & Coy, 2008.
 Howell, James, Lincoln 1958-1969. Motorbooks Intl., 1997.
 Kowalke, Ron, Standard Catalog of American Cars 1946-1975. Krause publications, 1997.

Cars introduced in 1952
Full-size vehicles
Capri
Rear-wheel-drive vehicles